Cryobiology is a bimonthly peer-reviewed scientific journal covering cryobiology. It was established in 1964 and is published by Elsevier on behalf of the Society for Cryobiology, of which it is the official journal. The editor-in-chief is D.M. Rawson (University of Bedfordshire). According to the Journal Citation Reports, the journal has a 2017 impact factor of 2.050.

References

External links

Cryobiology
Publications established in 1964
Bimonthly journals
Elsevier academic journals
Academic journals associated with international learned and professional societies
English-language journals